Limnological Review is an official journal of Polish Limnological Society and publishes original papers that deal with
theoretical and applied freshwater research, including such topics as limnology, ecohydrology, chemistry, physics, aquatic biology, aquatic ecology, ecotoxicology, sedimentology, hydrogeology and environmental engineering. The journal is led by two co-editors-in-Chief: Dr. Dariusz Borowiak (University of Gdańsk) and Dr. Piotr Rzymski (Poznan University of Medical Sciences)

External links
 Limnological Review official web site
 Instructions to Authors

Limnology
Earth and atmospheric sciences journals
Hydrology journals